John Neumeier (born February 24, 1939) is an American ballet dancer, choreographer, and director. He has been the director and chief choreographer of Hamburg Ballet since 1973. Five years later he founded the Hamburg Ballet School, which also includes a boarding school for students. In 1996, Neumeier was made ballet director of Hamburg State Opera.

Biography
Neumeier was born in Milwaukee, Wisconsin, where he received his first ballet training. He continued his dance training in Chicago at the Stone-Camyrn School of Ballet and performed with Sybil Shearer and Ruth Page. After completing a B.A. in English literature and theater studies at Marquette University in 1961, he continued his training in Copenhagen with Vera Volkova and at the Royal Ballet School in London. In 1963 he joined the Stuttgart Ballet under John Cranko, rising to the rank of soloist. In 1969 Neumeier became director of the Frankfurt Ballet, before becoming director and chief choreographer at the Hamburg Ballet in 1973. From 1971 through 1974 Neumeier was also guest choreographer for the Royal Winnipeg Ballet, where he provided repertoire and staged his version of The Nutcracker.

Noted works
Neumeier's choreographic output consists of more than 120 works, including many evening-length narrative ballets. Many are drawn from literary sources, such as Don Juan (created for the Frankfurt Ballet, 1972), Hamlet Connotations (1976) The Lady of the Camellias (Stuttgart Ballet, 1978, 2010), A Streetcar Named Desire (Stuttgart Ballet, 1983), Peer Gynt (1989), The Seagull (2002), Death in Venice (2003), The Little Mermaid (Royal Danish Ballet, 2010), Liliom (2011) and Tatiana (2014). Of particular importance are his adaptations of plays by William Shakespeare, including Romeo and Juliet (Frankfurt Ballet, 1974), A Midsummer Night's Dream (1977), Othello (1985), As You Like It (1985), Hamlet (Royal Danish Ballet, 1985) and VIVALDI, or What You Will (1996). He has reinterpreted and rechoreographed the seminal classics of the 19th century: The Nutcracker (Frankfurt Ballet, 1971), set in the world of 19th-century ballet, Illusions, like Swan Lake (1976), based loosely on the life of Ludwig II of Bavaria, The Sleeping Beauty (1978) and Giselle (2000). He has choreographed works on Biblical subjects, including The Legend of Joseph (Vienna State Ballet, 1977), Saint Matthew Passion (1981), Magnificat (Paris Opera Ballet, 1987), Requiem (1991), Messiah (1999) and Christmas Oratorio (2007, 2013), as well as ballets inspired by mythological subjects: Daphnis et Chloe (Frankfurt Ballet, 1972), Sylvia (Paris Opera Ballet, 1997), Orpheus (2009), Tristan (1982), The Saga of King Arthur (1982) and Parzival - Episodes and Echo (2006). Neumeier is particularly inspired by the life and work of Vaslav Nijinsky and has produced several ballets about him: Vaslav (1979), the full-length Nijinsky (2000) and Le Pavillon d'Armide (2009). Neumeier has also choreographed a number of ballets to the music of Gustav Mahler, including the biographical Purgatorio (2011), set to Deryck Cooke's reconstruction of Mahler's Tenth Symphony. In addition, Neumeier has choreographed Mahler's First (Lieb' und Leid und Welt und Traum, Ballet of the 20th Century, 1980), Third (1975), Fourth (Royal Ballet, 1977), Fifth (1989), Sixth (1984) and Ninth (In the Between, 1994) symphonies, as well as the Rückert-Lieder (1976), Des Knaben Wunderhorn (Soldier Songs, 1989) and Song of the Earth (Paris Opera Ballet, 2015). In 2017 he created and directed a new production of Gluck's Orfeo ed Euridice for the Lyric Opera of Chicago featuring the Joffrey Ballet.

Awards
1988 and 2008: Deutscher Tanzpreis
1992: Prix Benois de la Danse for best choreography (first recipient, for Windows on Mozart)
2003: Legion of Honour chevalier
2006: Honorary citizen of Hamburg
2007: Herbert von Karajan Music Prize
2013: Gustaf Gründgens Prize
2015: Kyoto Prize
2017: Prix de Lausanne Life Achievement Award (first recipient)
2021: Ingenio et arti Den Kgl. Opera 19.maj Copenhagen.

Bibliography
John Neumeier, In Bewegung. Edited by Stephan Mettin, Collection Rolf Heyne, 2008. 
John Neumeier. Images from a Life. Edited by Horst Koegler (German / English), Edel Germany, 2010. 
John Neumeier. Trente ans de ballets à l'Opéra de Paris. Edited by Jacqueline Thuilleux (French), Editions Gourcuff Gradenigo, 2010. 
Наталия Зозулина. Джон Ноймайер в Петербурге. Научный редактор В.В.Чистякова. Санкт-Петербург, "Алаборг", 2012. 
Наталия Зозулина. Джон Ноймайер и его балеты. Вечное движение. Санкт-Петербург, Академия Русского балета им. А.Я.Вагановой, 2019. 
Nijinsky. Ballett von John Neumeier. By Natalia Zozulina (German, ubersetzt aus dem Russischen von Natalia Freudenberg). St.Petersburg, 2020.

References

Sources
Silvia Poletti, John Neumeier. Palermo, L'Epos, 2004.

External links
Neumeier biography
Interview with Neumeier 
Hamburg Ballet

American male ballet dancers
American expatriates in Germany
1939 births
Living people
Artists from Milwaukee
People educated at the Royal Ballet School
Ballet choreographers
Culture in Hamburg
Kyoto laureates in Arts and Philosophy
Prix Benois de la Danse jurors
Commanders Crosses of the Order of Merit of the Federal Republic of Germany
Members of the Academy of Arts, Berlin
Herbert von Karajan Music Prize winners
Prix Benois de la Danse winners
20th-century American ballet dancers